Mykhaylo Mykhaylovich Kononenko (born 30 October 1987) is a Ukrainian professional road cyclist, who currently rides for UCI Continental team .

Major results
Source: 

2008
 1st  Overall Mainfranken-Tour
2010
 1st Stage 5 Grand Prix of Adygeya
 8th Grand Prix of Donetsk
2011
 1st Stage 5 Okolo Slovenska
 2nd Grand Prix of Donetsk
 6th Grand Prix of Moscow
2012
 1st Stage 4 Grand Prix of Sochi
 National Road Championships
2nd Time trial
6th Road race
 5th Overall Baltic Chain Tour
 5th Mayor Cup
 7th Grand Prix of Donetsk
 8th Overall Grand Prix of Sochi
2013
 1st Race Horizon Park 2
 2nd Overall Tour of Romania
1st Prologue (TTT)
 2nd Grand Prix of Donetsk
 National Road Championships
3rd Time trial
5th Road race
 3rd Overall Tour of Bulgaria
 3rd Race Horizon Park 1
 5th Coupe des Carpathes
 5th Grand Prix of Moscow
 5th Memorial Oleg Dyachenko
 6th Overall Tour of Hainan
 6th Tour of Almaty
 7th Mayor Cup
2014
 1st  Overall Tour of Qinghai Lake
1st  Points classification
1st Stage 3
 1st Race Horizon Park 2
 National Road Championships
2nd Time trial
5th Road race
 3rd Overall Baltic Chain Tour
1st Stages 1 & 3
 3rd Memoriał Henryka Łasaka
 10th Overall Grand Prix of Sochi
2015
 1st  Road race, National Road Championships
 1st Memorial Oleg Dyachenko
 1st Race Horizon Park Classic
 1st Stage 2 Five Rings of Moscow
 3rd Overall Tour of Mersin
1st Stage 3
 3rd Race Horizon Park Maidan
 4th Race Horizon Park Race for Peace
 7th Moscow Cup
 8th Overall Tour of Kuban
2016
 1st Memoriał Romana Siemińskiego
 1st Race Horizon Park Classic
 2nd Tour de Ribas
 4th Odessa Grand Prix
 4th Tour of Almaty
 5th Overall Tour of Ukraine
1st Stage 2a (TTT)
 6th Overall Tour of Qinghai Lake
 6th Visegrad 4 Bicycle Race – Kerékpárverseny
 6th Horizon Park Race for Peace
 9th Memoriał Andrzeja Trochanowskiego
2017
 1st Race Horizon Park for Peace
 1st Odessa Grand Prix
 1st Stage 7 Tour of Qinghai Lake
 3rd Overall Tour d'Azerbaïdjan
 5th Overall Tour of Hainan
 5th Tour de Ribas
 6th Overall Tour of Fuzhou
1st Stage 1
 7th Time trial, National Road Championships
 8th Overall Tour of Ukraine
1st Stage 2 (TTT)
2018
 National Road Championships
2nd Time trial
4th Road race
 3rd Overall Tour of Xingtai
 7th Overall Tour of Quanzhou Bay
 7th Overall Tour of Fuzhou
1st Stage 4
 10th Overall Tour of China I
2019
 2nd Overall Tour of Quanzhou Bay
1st Stage 1
 National Road Championships
3rd Road race
4th Time trial
 3rd Overall Tour of Xingtai
 3rd Grand Prix Justiniano Hotels
 6th Overall Tour of Taiyuan
 8th Grand Prix Minsk
 10th Overall Tour of China I
1st Stage 6
2020
 National Road Championships
1st  Road race
1st  Time trial
 1st Grand Prix Cappadocia
 1st Grand Prix Central Anatolia
 3rd Grand Prix Mount Erciyes
 4th Grand Prix Velo Erciyes
 5th Grand Prix World's Best High Altitude
2021
 1st  Time trial, National Road Championships
 1st Grand Prix Develi
2022
 2nd Grand Prix Velo Manavgat
 4th Grand Prix Develi

Notes

References

External links

1987 births
Living people
Ukrainian male cyclists
European Games competitors for Ukraine
Cyclists at the 2015 European Games
Cyclists at the 2019 European Games
Sportspeople from Chernihiv